Golmud may refer to:

 Golmud (also: Ge'ermu or Geermu) - city in China. 
 Golmud railway station - main railway station in Golmud
 Golmud East railway station